Silviu Vasiliu (born 23 June 1986) is a Romanian rugby union player. He plays in the prop position for amateur SuperLiga club Steaua București and București based European Challenge Cup side the Wolves. He also plays for Romania's national team the Oaks.

References

External links
Silviu Vasiliu at It'srugby

1986 births
Living people
Romanian rugby union players
Romania international rugby union players
Rugby union props